I'm Already There is the fifth studio album by American country music band Lonestar. Released in 2001 on BNA Records (see 2001 in country music), the album was certified platinum by the RIAA for sales of one million copies.

Serving as singles from this album were the title track (which spent six weeks at Number One on the Hot Country Songs charts) "Not a Day Goes By" (#3 on Hot Country Songs), "With Me" (#10), and "Unusually Unusual" (#12).

Track listing
All tracks produced by Dann Huff.

Personnel 
Lonestar
 Richie McDonald – lead vocals, keyboards, acoustic guitar 
 Dean Sams – keyboards, acoustic guitar, harmonica, backing vocals 
 Michael Britt – electric guitars, acoustic guitar, backing vocals
 Keech Rainwater – banjo, drums, percussion

Additional musicians
 Tim Akers – accordion, keyboards
 Matt Rollings – Hammond B3 organ, acoustic piano, keyboards
 Dann Huff – electric guitars
 Jerry McPherson – electric guitars
 B. James Lowry – acoustic guitar
 Biff Watson – acoustic guitar
 Paul Franklin – steel guitar, dobro
 Mike Brignardello – bass guitar 
 Paul Leim – drums
 Chris McHugh – drums
 Wayne Killius – drum programming 
 Eric Darken – percussion
 Larry Franklin – fiddle
 Aubrey Haynie – fiddle
 Jonathan Yudkin – fiddle, cello, mandolin
 Nashville String Machine – strings
 Ronn Huff – string arrangements and conductor 
 Robbie Cheuvront – backing vocals

Production
 Dann Huff – producer 
 Darrell Franklin – A&R direction 
 Jeff Balding – recording, mixing 
 Jed Hackett – mix assistant 
 David Bryant – recording assistant
 Mark Capps – recording assistant 
 Allen Ditto – recording assistant
 Greg Fogie – recording assistant
 Mark Hagen – recording assistant
 Ken Hertz – recording assistant
 Mike Konshak – recording assistant
 Jason Piske – recording assistant
 Christopher Rowe – digital editing 
 Shawn Simpson – digital editing 
 Doug Sax – mastering 
 Robert Hadley – mastering 
 The Mastering Lab (Hollywood, California) – mastering location 
 Mike "Frog" Griffith – production coordinator 
 Robert Sebree – photography 
 Jennifer Kemp – wardrobe stylist 
 Holly Ballard – grooming
 Cassie Roark – grooming 
 Melissa Schleicher – grooming

Chart performance

Weekly charts

Year-end charts

Certifications

References

2001 albums
Lonestar albums
BNA Records albums
Albums produced by Dann Huff